The Tesla Fremont Factory is an automobile manufacturing plant in Fremont, California, operated by Tesla, Inc. The facility opened as General Motors' Fremont Assembly in 1962, and was later operated by NUMMI, a GM–Toyota joint venture. Tesla took ownership in 2010. The plant  manufactures the Model S, Model X, Model 3, and Model Y, employing 22,000 people .

Background
Tesla had planned for an assembly factory in Albuquerque, New Mexico, as a central location for shipping. Construction was supposed to begin in April 2007, but was canceled. A separate greenfield factory to be built in San Jose, California was also announced. However, the cost was prohibitive, and the company looked for alternatives. Tesla initially also dismissed NUMMI for being too big and costly.

Some of the current facilities were operated as the GM Fremont Assembly from 1962 to 1982, and between 1984 and 2009 was used by New United Motor Manufacturing, Inc. (NUMMI), a joint venture between General Motors and Toyota. NUMMI yearly production peaked at 428,633 vehicles in 2006. Proposals to continue the site after 2010 included Aurica EVs, state incentives to Toyota, and a stadium, but none of them succeeded. In 2010 the mayor of Fremont viewed the site as dead.

The plant is located in the South Fremont District next to the Mud Slough between the Warm Springs BART station and the California State Route 262 connecting Interstate 880 and Interstate 680. Union Pacific Railroad had tracks running into the plant which had been used during NUMMI-era to carry finished cars.  All rail connections were subsequently removed, with the sidings used for more factory facilities.

On May 20, 2010, Tesla announced that it would purchase most (210 of 370 acres) of the former NUMMI site from Toyota for $42 million. As part of the agreement, Toyota would also purchase $50 million of common stock when Tesla held its IPO the next month.

The deal also included a promise that the two companies would partner on the "development of electric vehicles, parts, and production system and engineering support." Under the agreement, Tesla would go on to create the electric powertrain for the second-generation Toyota RAV4 EV. The two companies would later end their partnership in 2017.

Tesla officially took possession of the site on October 19, 2010, and opened it on October 27. The state of California has supported the renewal, expecting tax income from sustained jobs. The first retail delivery of the Tesla Model S took place during a special event at the Tesla Factory on June 22, 2012.

Facilities
NUMMI auctioned off the press lines, robots and other equipment to Toyota's other US factories, and Tesla purchased over $17 million of manufacturing equipment and spare parts in 2011, at significant discounts compared to new equipment. Additionally, Tesla bought a Schuler SMG hydraulic stamping press, worth $50 million new, for $6 million, including shipping costs from Detroit.

The factory was about 10 times the size Tesla initially needed, and much of the  site was unused in 2013, with most activity concentrated in the  main building that does the final assembly of vehicles.

Various parts of the NUMMI plant were planned to be modified to support Tesla vehicle production. For example, the passenger vehicle paint equipment was to be extensively modified through late 2011; converted from solvents to BASF water-based paint. Two paint lines (one car body, one component) were constructed from 2015. By 2014, half of the factory area was in use.

The floors, walls and ceiling are painted white with skylights and high-efficiency lighting to create an environment similar to a laboratory, and the production environment is cleaner and quieter than at NUMMI.

In July 2013, Tesla acquired an adjacent 35-acre property from Union Pacific Railroad for a test track.

Tesla built a casting foundry in Lathrop in 2015 supporting the Fremont production, and leased 1.3 million sq ft of warehouses in nearby Livermore in 2017.

In 2016, there were 4,500 parking spaces, and Tesla purchased a neighboring 25-acre site from Lennar. In August 2017, Tesla won approval from the Fremont City Council to double the size of the facility with about 4.6 million new square feet of space. Tesla also planned to expand production capacity five-fold to 500,000 vehicles per year by 2018, or 10,000 units per week.

As of early 2019, the facility has  of floor space.

Employees
Tesla started production with 1,000 workers. By 2013, this had risen to 3,000, and to 6,000 people in June 2016. In 2016, preparing for Model 3 production, Tesla planned to increase their work force to about 9,000 people. In fall of 2017, Tesla employed some 10,000 at the Fremont plant, a number still being shared in June 2018.

In addition to Tesla employees, the company uses contractors for various functions. In May 2018, Elon Musk, in an apparent goal of reducing dead weight and raising efficiency and quality within its operation, decided to cut contractors and sub-contractors, ordering staff to justify and personally vouch for contractors worth keeping.

On 14 December 2021, six women who work at Tesla filed lawsuits alleging the company fostered a culture of sexual harassment at its Fremont plant and other facilities. The female employees said that they were subjected to lewd comments and catcalling, physically intimate touching and discrimination. Several women alleged that nothing changed after they complained about the behaviour, while others claimed that their superiors participated in the harassment.

Production

The plant's first series production vehicle is the Tesla Model S full-sized battery electric sedan.

In 2011, Tesla transitioned from 20 hand-assembled "alpha builds" to 50 "beta builds", production-validation vehicles built entirely at the Tesla Factory. These cars would also be used for system integration, engineering testing, and federal crash-testing and certification. Tesla expected to produce about 5,000 Model S sedans in 2012, with production ramping up to 20,000 in 2013 if necessary. The first retail delivery of the Model S took place during a special event held at the Tesla Factory on June 22, 2012. Production grew from 15 to 20 cars completed/week in August 2012 to over 200 by November 5 and 400 by late December. In late December Tesla revised their 2012 delivery projections down to 2,500 cars.

Deliveries reached 6,892 units in the last three months of 2013. In December 2013, California announced it would give Tesla a US$34.7 million tax break to expand production by an estimated 35,000 vehicles annually from its Fremont, California plant.

Tesla announced that production was expected to climb from 600 cars per week in early 2014 to about 1,000 units per week by year-end. Tesla produced 7,535 units during the first quarter of 2014, and expected to produce 8,500 to 9,000 cars in the second quarter of 2014. As of early May 2014, the production rate was 700 cars per week.

, about 1,000 cars were made per week, mostly to pre-orders. Musk says they averaged around 20 changes to the S per week.

Production of the Model X joined the Model S during 2015, following a short reconfiguration of the production line in July 2014. The first Model X that didn't need corrections was made in April 2016. Tesla moved some of the equipment to their Tilburg final assembly plant in the Netherlands in 2015.

On July 2, 2015, Tesla announced that it had delivered a total of 21,537 vehicles in the first half of 2015. All vehicles were manufactured at the Fremont plant.

In May 2016 Tesla raised $1.46 billion in stock, of which $1.26 billion is to prepare production of the Model 3 scheduled for late 2017. Changing from serially producing the Model S and X to the mass production of Model 3 is viewed by experts as a significant step. Tesla stated in May 2016 that it does not have that capability and needs to acquire it, which it partly did with the acquisition of Grohmann Automation in 2016 and purchase of mass production equipment. Whereas the Roadster was delayed by 9 months, the Model S more than six months, and the Model X more than 18 months, analysts estimated in December 2016 that the Model 3 production preparation was on schedule for the second half of 2017.

On August 3, 2016, Tesla announced that it was consistently producing 2,000 vehicles per week at the end of Q2 2016. About 2,500 workers operate the day shift and 2,000 attend the night shift.

Tesla makes many parts itself, which is unusual in the auto business. Tesla also works with 300 suppliers around the world, of which 50 are in Northern California, and 10 in the San Francisco Bay Area. Tesla's dashboard supplier SAS rents a 142,188-square-foot building near the factory, beginning in January 2017 with 200 employees. Other suppliers that have opened facilities in the area to be close to Tesla include Eclipse Automation and Futuris Automotive Group. Tesla produces many of its seats at its own seat factory a few miles south of the main factory.

In 2020, due to the COVID-19 pandemic, Tesla implemented virus mitigation efforts in its Shanghai and Fremont factories. Shanghai resumed production on February 10, while the Fremont and New York factories were to reduce activity by March 24. On May 9, Tesla sued Alameda County in order to force the reopening of the Fremont Factory. Tesla told its employees that it had received approval to restart production in the week beginning May 18, and the lawsuit was dropped on May 20.

As other US factories reduced production during the COVID pandemic, the Fremont factory became the plant with the highest weekly production in North America at the end of 2021. Elon Musk announced at the 2021 Shareholder Meeting, Oct 7, 2021, that Tesla hoped to increase the production capacity at the Fremont Factory by 50% in the next couple of years.

Tesla Model S manufacturing process

Overview
The manufacturing process uses more than 160 specialist robots, including 10 of the largest robots in the world, which are named after X-Men characters. Many of the Model S's unique components, including the battery pack, battery module, and drive units are manufactured in-house. The plant has a high level of integration compared with other modern car assembly plants, with most processes taking place within the Tesla Factory. This includes most of the stamping and machining, painting, and some coding. The hydraulic press lines used to stamp 5,000 body panels per day with a force of 10,000 tonnes, are the largest in North America and the 6th largest in the world. Around 60% of the car parts are sourced from North America, while Japan is the second-biggest source of components . Design engineers also work at the factory itself, rather than a separate facility.

Individual vehicles take between three and five days to complete the assembly process. The assembly line moves at a speed of 5 cm/s. Tesla prefers delivery by train rather than by truck, as costs and damages are less.

Drive unit construction

Motor construction

The alternating current Induction motor is constructed in-house. The main components of the motor are the stator and rotor.

It then pulls the copper wire into a stack. The motor has three phases and so requires three coils of copper. A worker then lengthens and straightens each bundle of wire and inserts a hydraulic lift to transfer the motor to the next station.

A worker insulates each bundle of copper wire in a plastic sleeve to prevent the bundles from touching one another.  The ends of the bundles are then snipped to the correct length. Lugs are added and crimped to form attachment points for the motor's three phases. A specialized automatic sewing machine then binds the coils together to keep them in place, the increased tightness of the binding provided by a robotic sewing machine increases the efficiency of the motor. The stator is then encased in a two part epoxy resin to help in evenly distributing the motor's heat. The stator is now complete and is inserted into a heated metal case, locking the stator inside as the case cools.

A worker uses a hoisting system to insert the rotor inside the stator completing the construction of the motor.

Additional drive unit components
A worker then installs the differential and other sections of the gearbox, attaching it together using bolts.  An air leak test is then conducted. The three phase tripole power inverter is then installed onto the top of the motor to convert direct current from the battery into alternating current for the motor to use. The motor then undergoes a series of automated tests taking 4 minutes to ensure correct function, and then is moved to the general assembly area to be installed into the car.

The power inverter is constructed from metal–oxide–semiconductor (MOS) power transistors. Early Tesla vehicles used MOS-controlled insulated-gate bipolar transistors (IGBTs), which have been replaced by silicon carbide (SiC) power MOSFETs (MOS field-effect transistors) in later Tesla vehicles since 2018.

Battery pack construction

The Model S 85s battery pack contains 7,104 '18650' lithium-ion battery cells in 16 modules wired in series (14 in the flat section and two stacked on the front). Each module contains six groups of 74 cells wired in parallel; the six groups are then wired in series within the module.  the battery pack uses modified Panasonic NCR18650A 3100 mAh cells with nickel-cobalt-aluminum cathodes.

The use of commodity cells, similar to those found in laptops and mobile phones, is in contrast to every other electric vehicle manufacturer who use specialized large format Li-Ion cells. The liquid-cooled battery pack uses an intumescent gel to aid in fireproofing and even heat distribution.

Body construction

Aluminium coil blanking
98% of the Tesla Model S body is constructed from aluminium and is produced from between 50 and 60 separate coils of aluminium each for various components. The coils are unwound, flattened and cut in a blanking machine; additional cutting is also done using a laser cutter. The total weight of the aluminium used in the Model S is around
.

Tandem press lines

A robot then transfers the aluminium blanks into the tandem press lines where the sheets are stamped into the various panels of the cars. The Schuler SMG hydraulic stamping press line is the largest in North America and the 6th largest in the world. The presses use up to 11,000 ton-force to form the body panels; the upper section applies 1400 tonnes of downward force and the lower section 130 tonnes. The blank aluminium sheet is stretched over the lower draw die and openings are cut with robots transferring the panels between processes. The workers then inspect each panel to ensure correct pressing.  The parts are then stacked in frames and stored. The machines press one part every 6 seconds and create 5,000 parts per day.

Drive unit installation
The car is raised and the drive unit is installed into the rear axle assembly. The drive unit provides power directly to the wheels without a drive shaft.

Battery pack installation
The battery pack weighs almost  and is delivered to the installation area and is raised into the car using a lift. A titanium plate is installed under the battery pack which protects it in the event of a high-speed collision and to protect from road debris.

Safety incidents
In November 2013 there was an accident when the low-pressure aluminum casting press failed, spilling molten metal on three workers and causing their clothing to catch fire. Tesla was fined 89,000 by the California Division of Occupational Safety and Health for seven safety violations, six considered serious.

On April 1, 2019, Tesla reached a settlement with the United States Environmental Protection Agency (EPA) over its mishandling of hazardous waste in 2017. Tesla allowed hazardous waste to accumulate on site without a permit beyond the allowed 90 days; the EPA found Tesla failed to "promptly clean up flammable paint and or solvent mixtures", left two  containers of hazardous waste open with "no gasket or locking mechanism", and violated air emission standards for three leaky transmission lines that the waste moved through.

See also 
 List of Tesla factories

References

External links

The Tesla Factory: Birthplace of the Model S Tesla Motors photo tour
Stamping, body, paint, automated motor production, assembly, factory upgrade (official Tesla)
How Tesla Builds Electric Cars, A 3-part documentary on the Tesla Factory from Wired magazine
"Brand New Tesla Factory", National Geographic video;  by National Geographic Channel Megafactories
NPR's This American Life's full hour story of the creation and demise of NUMMI – episode #403  from This American Life

Tesla factories
Motor vehicle assembly plants in California
Manufacturing companies based in the San Francisco Bay Area
Companies based in Fremont, California
Vehicle manufacturing companies established in 2010
2010 establishments in California
Giga Press